John W. Provine High School is a public high school located in Jackson, Mississippi, United States. It is part of the Jackson Public School District. Nicknamed "Ram City", the school serves students in grades 9–12 in the West Jackson area. Students from the Northwest Hills Terrace, the Queens, Country Club Hills, and Westchester Hills subdivisions attend the school. The current principal is Dr.Shelita Brown

History 
The school was established in 1956.

In 1992, it was designated a service-learning school. Since then, various organizations in the school have participated in service-learning projects. These include collecting and disseminating canned goods to the needy, collecting toiletries and pillows to distribute to the elderly in nursing homes, tutoring and mentoring elementary school students, assisting Habitat for Humanity with building houses for the destitute, and participating in walk-a-thons.

Demographics
There were a total of 1,179 students enrolled in Provine High during the 2006–07 school year. The gender makeup of the district was 49% female and 51% male. The racial makeup of the school was 100.00% African American.

Programs

Clubs and organizations
Provine offers extracurricular activities including Academic Quiz Bowl, Art Club, Drama Club, Future Educators of America, Mu Alpha Theta, National Honor Society, and Student Council.

Provine is the only high school in Jackson with a robotics team. The team's sponsors are Redmond Malone and Patricia Daniels. The team is composed of 29 students and three teachers. Approximately half of the team is female. The team includes two freshmen, nine sophomore, eight juniors, and ten seniors. The team's sponsors include Delphi, NASA, Jackson State University, Entergy, Geodessy Survey, and Jackson Medical Mall.

The school also offers the Provine JROTC program. This program includes three JROTC instructors and no more than 60 students.

Performing groups
There are five performing groups at Provine High School: the "Spirit of Provine" Cheerleaders, the "Soul of Provine" Choir, the "Essence of Provine" Dance–Drill Team, Provine Flag/Colorguard Corp, and the Provine High School Marching Band. The band has more than 100 students. Provine High School Marching Band has been one of Jackson's best bands. In 2006, Provine High School Band was nominated as the best band in Jackson. It has also been an all-superior band for a few years. As of 2009, the band had upgraded to over 100-120 band members. They have also had the best percussion section, Percussion of Destruction (POD) The director of the band is Carlton Williams.

Feeder pattern 
The following schools feed into Provine High School.

Middle schools
Blackburn Middle School
Elementary schools
Clausell Elementary School
Lake Elementary School
Pecan Park Elementary School
Raines Elementary School

Notable alumni
 Charlie Anderson: former NFL player
 David Banner: rapper and producer
 Tommy Kelly: former NFL player
 Justin Reed: former NBA player
 Fred Smoot: former NFL player
 Savante Stringfellow: former Olympian
 Kendell Watkins: former NFL player
 Nanette Workman: singer-songwriter

References 

 https://archive.today/20120715205018/http://orig.clarionledger.com/news/0306/16/o01.html

Public high schools in Mississippi
Schools in Jackson, Mississippi